Senator Osborn may refer to:

Andrew L. Osborn (1815–1891), Indiana State Senate
Jones Osborn (1921–2014), Arizona State Senate
Ralph Osborn (1780–1835), Ohio State Senate
Thomas W. Osborn (1833–1898), U.S. Senator from Florida

See also
Senator Osborne (disambiguation)